Gordon William Lillie (February 14, 1860 – February 3, 1942), known professionally as Pawnee Bill, was an American showman and performer who specialized in Wild West shows and was known for his short partnership with William "Buffalo" Bill Cody. In 2010, he was inducted into the Hall of Great Westerners of the National Cowboy & Western Heritage Museum.

Early life and family
Pawnee Bill was born on February 14, 1860, in Bloomington, Illinois. His father Newton operated a flour mill in Bloomington; the mill burned to the ground in 1876. The family then moved to Wellington, Kansas, where Gordon developed a love for the West.  By the age of 19, he was working on the Pawnee Indian agency in Indian Territory.  In 1883, he was given the chance to work as the Pawnee interpreter with Buffalo Bill's Wild West Show.  His work with the show was the origin of his nickname as "Pawnee Bill".

Wild West show

After courting for two years, Lillie married May Manning in 1886, a petite Quaker from Pennsylvania.  She was younger than he, a graduate of Smith College, and the daughter of a wealthy Philadelphia physician.  Her parents objected at first to their refined young daughter marrying a cowboy, but eventually they agreed to the union.

In 1888, the Lillies launched their own Wild West show, which they called "Pawnee Bill’s Historic Wild West".  May starred in the show as the "Champion Girl Horseback Shot of the West."  Their first season was a financial disaster. They re-organized as a smaller operation called "Pawnee Bill’s Historical Wild West Indian Museum and Encampment Show."  That show was popular and financially successful. Lillie added Jose Barrera to the cast; he was widely popular performing as "Mexican Joe".  Mamie Francis performed with Pawnee Bill's from 1901 to 1905. In 1907, Lillie hired performers from a variety of backgrounds.  The show included Mexican cowboys, Pawnee, Japanese performers, and Arab jugglers.  The ensemble debuted as "Pawnee Bill’s Great Far East Show."

In 1908, Pawnee Bill and Buffalo Bill joined forces and created the "Two Bills' show.  That show was foreclosed on when it was playing in Denver, Colorado.

While Gordon Lillie had been on tour, May supervised their buffalo ranch, now known as Pawnee Bill Ranch.  The Lillies completed work on their Arts-and-Crafts style home on Blue Hawk Peak in 1910.

Later life
Pawnee Bill invested in banking, real estate, and oil. He operated various business interests and dabbled in film making at his ranch. In 1930, May and Pawnee Bill opened Pawnee Bill’s Old Town near the ranch.  They sold Indian and Mexican crafts, and featured annual rodeos. That enterprise burned to the ground in the 1940s and was never rebuilt.

In 1936, the couple celebrated their 50th wedding anniversary in Taos, New Mexico.  In September of that year they attended a local celebration in Tulsa, Oklahoma.  While driving back to their ranch that night, Pawnee Bill lost control of their vehicle.  May died as a result of her injuries, and Pawnee Bill never fully recovered. He died in his sleep on February 3, 1942, at the age of 81 in his home outside of Pawnee, Oklahoma.

Legacy
The Pawnee Bill Ranch continues to exist, including a museum.  The Pawnee Bill Memorial Rodeo is held annually, as is a version of Pawnee Bill’s Original Wild West Show.

References

Bibliography
 
 Hyde, G. Hyde and Savoie Lottinville. The Pawnee Indians: Civilization of the American Indian Series, (2007).
 Moses, L.G. Wild West Shows and the Images of American Indians, 1883-1933. University of New Mexico Press, (1999).
 
 Wallis, Michael. The Real Wild West, The 101 Ranch and the Creation of the American West. St. Martin's Press, New York.  (1999).
 
 Weltfish, G. The Lost Universe: Pawnee Life and Culture (1990).

External links

 
 Pawnee Bill Ranch and Museum
 

1860 births
1942 deaths
People from Bloomington, Illinois
American stunt performers
Wild West show founders and owners
Rodeo promoters and managers
Entertainers from Oklahoma
Cowboys
People from Wellington, Kansas
Bloomington High School (Bloomington, Illinois) alumni